Émile François Ouchard (30 April 1872–27 February 1951) was a bow maker for stringed instruments / Archetier  from Mirecourt, Vosges, France. Ouchard was also known as "Ouchard Père".

Biography  	
Émile François Ouchard began his apprenticeship in 1886 at the workshop of Eugène Cuniot-Hury in Mirecourt.  Following the death of Cuniot-Hury in 1910, Ouchard stayed with Cuniot's widow to assist her in the running of the workshop, and so came to inherit the Cuniot-Hury business.

In 1923, he opened his own workshop at 1, rue Canon in Mirecourt. By then Emile Ouchard had become  a prolific bow maker, and prior to opening his own workshop had worked for Joseph Aubry, Paul Bisch & Olivier, Georges Coné, Charles Enel, Jean Lavest and Cuniot-Hury

Emile François Ouchard died in his hometown of Mirecourt in 1951. Emile Ouchard used only one stamp during his career: « Emile Ouchard ». He was succeeded by his son and pupil, Émile Auguste Ouchard (1900 - 1969). E. F. Ouchard's daughter, Margueritte Ouchard, married François Lotte.

References

 
 
 
 .
 .

1872 births
1951 deaths
Luthiers from Mirecourt
Bow makers